The East Cleveland City School District is a public school district headquartered in East Cleveland, Ohio, United States. It serves East Cleveland and a section of Cleveland Heights.

Finances
The district was known for mismanagement of finances; around 2000 the Federal Bureau of Investigation and the Internal Revenue Service had suspicions that criminal activity had occurred in the district.

The district was placed in fiscal emergency and had a Fiscal Oversight Commission, but this designation was removed several years ago.

Dress code
All students in the district are required to wear school uniforms.

Schools

Secondary schools
 Shaw High School (East Cleveland)
Shaw High Schools Marching Cardinals Band has won numerous awards and has travelled to China.
Career/Tech education is a major strength.
Shaw High School offers Advanced Placement Environmental Science and other AP courses.

 Heritage Middle School (East Cleveland)(Former Kirk Junior High School)

Primary schools
 Caledonia Elementary School (Cleveland Heights)
 Chambers Elementary School (East Cleveland)
 Mayfair Elementary School (East Cleveland)
 Prospect Elementary School (East Cleveland)
 Superior Elementary School (East Cleveland)

All elementary schools and Heritage Middle Schools have new STEM labs as of the 2014-2015 school year.
All school have band instruction.  In the elementary schools, this starts at the 5th grade.
Chambers Elementary School has a Gifted & Talented program, offers both Spanish and Chinese instruction, and has a Suzuki Violin program.
Both Superior Elementary and Chambers Elementary have gardens.

Former schools

Rozelle Elementary School (East Cleveland)

References

External links

 East Cleveland City Schools

School districts in Cuyahoga County, Ohio
East Cleveland, Ohio